Chen Chia-nan (born 24 July 1942) is a Taiwanese weightlifter. He competed in the men's lightweight event at the 1968 Summer Olympics.

References

1942 births
Living people
Taiwanese male weightlifters
Olympic weightlifters of Taiwan
Weightlifters at the 1968 Summer Olympics
Place of birth missing (living people)